Magnolia Mills, also known as Innes Elevator Mills, was a historic grist mill complex located at Warrensburg, Johnson County, Missouri. The original building was built in 1879, and enlarged in 1884, 1888, and 1918.  It consisted of a four-story, frame mill building with a three-story frame elevator topped with a monitor roof and large cupola.  A modern concrete elevator and mill were added in the late-1940s.  Only the concrete elevator remains of the original buildings.

It was listed on the National Register of Historic Places in 1996.

References

Grinding mills on the National Register of Historic Places in Missouri
Industrial buildings completed in 1879
Buildings and structures in Johnson County, Missouri
National Register of Historic Places in Johnson County, Missouri
1879 establishments in Missouri